Friedrich "Frieder" Rupp (26 November 1917 – 15 May 1943) was a Luftwaffe ace and recipient of the Knight's Cross of the Iron Cross during World War II.  The Knight's Cross of the Iron Cross was awarded to recognise extreme battlefield bravery or successful military leadership.  Friedrich Rupp was shot down on 15 May 1943 over the North Sea, he was posthumously promoted to Oberleutnant.  During his career he was credited with 52 victories, 50 over the Eastern Front and 2 over the Western Front.

Awards
 Ehrenpokal der Luftwaffe (1 July 1942)
 Front Flying Clasp of the Luftwaffe
 Iron Cross (1939)
 2nd Class
 1st Class
 German Cross in Gold on 27 October 1942 as Leutnant in the 7./Jagdgeschwader 54
 Knight's Cross of the Iron Cross on 24 January 1943 as Leutnant and pilot in the 7./Jagdgeschwader 54

References

Citations

Bibliography

External links
TracesOfWar.com
Aces of the Luftwaffe

1917 births
1943 deaths
German World War II flying aces
Recipients of the Gold German Cross
Recipients of the Knight's Cross of the Iron Cross
Luftwaffe personnel killed in World War II
Military personnel from Freiburg im Breisgau
People from the Grand Duchy of Baden
Aviators killed by being shot down